Wilfred Shardlow (30 September 1902 – 21 June 1956) was an English cricketer who played for Derbyshire between 1925 and 1928.

Career 
Shardlow was born at Clowne, Derbyshire. He made his debut for Derbyshire in the 1925 season in July against Yorkshire where he made 11 in his first innings. He played two more matches that year and played fully in the 1926 and 1927 season. In 1927 he achieved 5-41 bowling against Glamorgan and made his top score of 39 not out against Kent. He only played four matches in the 1928 season which was his last first-class season.  He was a right-arm fast-medium bowler who took 56 first-class wickets with an average of  34.62 and a best performance of  5-41. As a  left-hand batsman he played 42 innings in 38 matches with a top score of  39 and an average of 7.17.

Shardlow was still playing cricket in 1955 when he appeared in match for Bass Worthington. He died the following year at Burton-on-Trent, Staffordshire at the age of 54.

References

1902 births
1956 deaths
Derbyshire cricketers
English cricketers